The Divided Lady is a 1960 novel by Scottish writer Bruce Marshall.

Plot summary 
The style of this book is unusual for a Marshall work.  The first half of the book alternates present time with flashbacks from the central character's earlier life.

James Childers, an accountant with a large London firm is sent to Rome to investigate a business deal.  The Sisters of Ramoth-Gilead have invested a considerable sum with Morobito, a famous film producer, to make a movie about St. Joseph Benedict Cottolengo of Turin.  The Sisters suspect they have been swindled.

Childers, who served in Rome in the post-World War II era, quickly revisits old haunts.  The chapters switch back and forth between events during his original tour in Rome and the current one.

Post-World War II Childers worked for the British Army dealing with Displaced Persons, specifically their financial situations.  In his spare time he pursued Phoebe & Sarah, beautiful, identical twins who are aides of the General Childers also works for.

In the present time, while investigating the Sisters' case, Childers renews his acquaintanceship with Bice, the daughter of a wealthy Duke who was a teenager when he was last in Rome.  Bice hopes to use this relationship to get a part in Morobito's film.

But Childers also meets Mila, who is what the Italians call a "Divided Lady," meaning that she is separated from her husband and hoping to obtain an annulment from the Catholic Church.

References

1960 British novels
Novels by Bruce Marshall
Novels set in Rome
William Collins, Sons books
Fictional identical twins